The Nippon Decimal Classification (NDC, also called the Nippon Decimal System) is a system of library classification developed for mainly Japanese-language books maintained and revised by the Japan Library Association since 1948. Originally developed in 1929 by Kiyoshi Mori, the 10th and latest edition of this system was published in 2014. The decimal notation system is similar to the Dewey Decimal System, and the order of main classes is inspired from the Cutter Expansive Classification. The system is based upon using a three digit number to classify subjects, where more digits can be added if necessary and a decimal point is used to separate the third and fourth digit. The first division level is called a class, the second level is called a division, and the third level is called a section. Each '1-9' digit is used to represent a specific category, with the digit '0' being used to represent general works.

Main classes 
The system is made up of ten categories:

 000 General
 100 Philosophy
 200 History
 300 Social sciences
 400 Natural sciences
 500 Technology 
 600 Industry
 700 Arts
 800 Language
 900 Literature

Description of the Divisions

000 General 
The General category contains books that contain general information, rather than information about specific topics. The sub-categories of the General category are:
010 Libraries, Library & information science
020 Books, Bibliography
030 Encyclopaedias
040 General collected essays
050 General serial publications
060 General societies
070 Journalism, Newspapers
080 General collections
090 Rare books, Local collections, Special collections

100 Philosophy 
The Philosophy category contains books that contain information regarding philosophy, religion, and psychology. The sub-categories of the Philosophy category are:
110 Special treatises on philosophy
120 Oriental philosophy
130 Western philosophy
140 Psychology
150 Ethics & morals
160 Religion
170 Shinto
180 Buddhism
190 Christianity

200 History 
The History category contains books that contain information regarding local and foreign history. The sub-categories of the History category are:
210 History of Japan
220 History of Asia 
230 History of Europe
240 History of Africa
250 History of North America
260 History of South America
270 History of Oceania & Polar region
280 Biography
290 Geography, Topography, Travel

300 Social Sciences 
The Social Sciences category contains books that contain information regarding modern day society, such as government systems and cultural traditions. The sub-categories of the Social Sciences category are:
310 Politics
320 Law
330 Economics
340 Finance
350 Statistics
360 Sociology
370 Education
380 Customs, Folklore, Ethnology
390 National defence, Military science

400 Natural Sciences 
The Natural Sciences category contains books that contain information regarding the natural world, such as plants, animals, and natural laws, such as math and physics. The sub-categories of the Natural Sciences category are:
410 Mathematics
420 Physics
430 Chemistry
440 Astronomy, Space science
450 Earth science
460 Biology
470 Botany
480 Zoology
490 Medicine, Pharmacology

500 Technology and Engineering 
The Technology & Engineering category contains books that contain information regarding man-made scientific achievements. The sub-categories of the Technology & Engineering category are:
510 Construction, Civil engineering
520 Architecture
530 Mechanical engineering, Nuclear engineering
540 Electrical & Electronic engineering
550 Maritime & Naval engineering
560 Metal & Mining engineering
570 Chemical technology
580 Manufacturing
590 Domestic arts and sciences

600 Industry and Commerce 
The Industry and Commerce category contains books that contain information regarding business, products, transportation systems, and money. The sub-categories of the Industry and Commerce category are:
610 Agriculture
620 Horticulture
630 Silk industry
640 Animal husbandry
650 Forestry
660 Fishing
670 Commerce
680 Transportation & Traffic
690 Communications

700 Arts 
The Arts category contains books that contain information regarding various art forms, such as paintings, writing, and music. The sub-categories of the Arts category are:
710 Plastic arts (sculpture)
720 Painting & Calligraphy
730 Engraving
740 Photography & Printing
750 Craft
760 Music & Dance
770 Theatre, Motion Pictures
780 Sports, Physical Education
790 Recreation, Amusements

800 Language 
The Language category contains books that contain information regarding various languages spoken around the world. The sub-categories of the Language category are:
810 Japanese
820 Chinese
830 English
840 German
850 French
860 Spanish
870 Italian
880 Russian
890 Other languages

900 Literature 
The Literature category contains books with fictional content, such as romance novels and adventure stories. The sub-categories of the Literature category are:
910 Japanese literature
920 Chinese literature
930 English & American literature
940 German literature
950 French literature
960 Spanish literature
970 Italian literature
980 Russian & Soviet literature
990 Other language literature

References

External links 
 Japan Library Association
 CyberLibrarian

Library cataloging and classification
Decimal classification systems